Markus Burger (born September 30, 1966) is a German pianist, composer and music educator. 

During 1999–2002 he had a life threatening illness and recorded solo piano pieces for the album Ultreya. He is the founder of the trio Accidental Tourists, which has recorded for Challenge Records. He is the founder of the North Atlantic Jazz Alliance and the European Quartett Septer Bourbon, which recorded for Jazz Line Records. His Duo Spiritual Standards with saxophonist Jan von Klewitz recorded albums for Jazzline Records and Challenge Records.

Discography
 1996 Fishing for Compliments Septer Bourbon
 1999 Spiritual Standards with Jan von Klewitz
 2000 Spiritual Standards [Secunda] with Jan von Klewitz
 2001 The Smile of the Honeycakehorse Septer Bourbon
 2002 Ultreya
 2004  Markus Burger, John Tchicai & Matt Marucci- Genesis (Cadence Jazz Records)
 2005 Inside.Outside with Jan von Klewitz
 2006 NAJA North Atlantic Jazz Alliance
 2007 Tertia with Jan von Klewitz
 2007 Vesprae Ensemble Katharsis
 2008 Quarta - Spiritual Standards from the New World with Jan von Klewitz
 2012 Accidental Tourists: The L.A. Sessions – Markus Burger (piano), Joe LaBarbera (drums), Bob Magnusson (bass) – Challenge Records
 2016 Accidental Tourists: The Banff Sessions - Markus Burger (piano), Kenny Wheeler (trumpet), Jan von Klewitz (saxophonist), Norma Winstone (vocals) – Challenge
 2018  Spiritual Standards Quinta, Songs inspired by Martin Luther (Challenge Records)
 2019  Accidental Tourists: The Alaska Sessions- Markus Burger (piano), Bob Magnusson (bass), Peter Erskine (drums) (Challenge Records)
 2022 The Vienna Sessions, Markus Burger Solo (Challenge Records)

References

3. Christoph Spendel Tastenwelt, March, 2022 (pages 12,13,16,17,18,19)

External links 
 
 Accidental Tourists Trio 
  North Atlantic Jazz Alliance
  Spiritual Standards
The Vienna Session Review
https://www.boesendorfer.com/en/artists/markus-burger
https://www.bluethnerworld.com/index.php/en/artists/169-burger-markus

1966 births
Living people
German jazz pianists
Mainstream jazz pianists
German jazz composers
Male jazz composers
Musicians from Santa Monica, California
Avant-garde jazz pianists
German male pianists
21st-century pianists
21st-century American male musicians